Toca Boca is a Swedish video game developer focused on child-friendly applications for tablets and smartphones – the studio has more than 70 active million app users worldwide. Toca Boca's games are based on the idea that children should be able to understand them without adult instruction. The games cannot be won or lost, nor do they have high scores or courses. The studio is, since April 2016, owned by Spin Master and is based in Stockholm, Sweden.   

Toca Boca was founded in September 2010 by Swedes Emil Ovemar and Björn Jeffery, both of whom worked for the Bonnier Group. Ovemar and Jeffery felt that there was a lack of good educational and playful touchscreen games for the youngest players. The company launched its first app, Helicopter Taxi, in March 2011 and has since released nearly 50 more apps, making Toca Boca one of the largest app developers in the children's games market. Toca Boca’s apps has been downloaded more than 400 million times by users in over 238 markets ever since the first launch.

In 2016, Bonnier sold Toca Boca to the Canadian toy and entertainment company Spin Master for SEK 263 million. In 2020, Fredrik Löving took over as Toca Boca's new CEO. Toca Boca saw significant growth in 2021, and Spin Master stated in its annual report that Digital Games, of which Toca Boca is a significant part, had a revenue of over US$ 174.8 million. Their monthly active users increased by 64% to over 70 million globally during the same period. Three-quarters of the users came from Toca Boca's most popular app, Toca Life World.

Naming 
Toca Boca means "Touch the mouth" in Spanish and comes from the fact that the player would touch the logo's colorful mouth to start the first games the company developed.

Applications

Toca Boca has released 46 digital toys that have been downloaded more than 400 million times around the world, making it the No. 1 paid app publisher in the App Store. Various applications developed include:

Helicopter Taxi
Helicopter Taxi, the first application released by Toca Boca, was a digital toy that integrated augmented reality effects. Using a device's camera, the player designates six horizontal surfaces in reality as "The Beach," "The Tall Building," "The Factory," "The Hospital," 
and "The Hangar." The physical locations do not need to match the landing description, however, and the surfaces for landing do not need to be exact or consistent. The toy's characters consist of two pilots and five passengers, and the objective is to pick up as well as bring the passengers to their destination by moving about with the device to simulate the helicopter flying.
This game was later discontinued.

Toca Tea Party
The second application released by Toca Boca, Toca Tea Party, imitates a tea party, primarily through roleplaying. The player is able to design their table by selecting the tablecloth, dishes, music, and drinks. Interactions such as "eating," "drinking," "spilling," and "cleaning up" exist. Party guests may consist of toys and/or people with the touch screen support for multiple users simultaneously.

Toca Kitchen
Toca Kitchen, the tenth application, allows the player to interact by choosing how to prepare a food (slice, boil, blend, etc.) in order to feed one of the four characters. Each character has his or her own preferences of ingredient and style, evident through the character's reactions and willingness to eat a product. Food can be obtained infinitely many times and there are few limits to the number of times a food can be processed.

Toca Kitchen Has 4 Games, Toca Kitchen (2011) Toca Kitchen, Monsters (2012), Toca Kitchen 2 And The Last From 2018

Toca Life Series
Toca Life is a series of games that encourage the player to imagine stories 
for characters in the game. The player can drag the character around 
the screen with their finger and make him or her eat, sit, etc. In the series, there 
are different locations the character could go to based on the game's 
theme. (Town, Farm, Office, etc.) There are groups such as Kids, Elders, Babies, and Creatures. The player can add more than one 
character to a scene. Dressing up the characters was introduced in Toca Life: City.

List of Toca Life Installments (in order):

Toca Life: Town
Toca Life: City
Toca Life: School
Toca Life: Vacation
Toca Life: Farm
Toca Life: Stable
Toca Life: Hospital
Toca Life: Office
Toca Life: Pets
Toca Life: After School

Toca Life: World
Toca Life: World was released in November 21, 2018—it connected all the existing standalone Toca Life apps into one interconnected universe. Unlike the rest of the games in the series, the app is free to download, and players are invited to play the free version (which comes with Bop City, a free house, as well as the free version of a character creator,And free places), or to customize the app with whatever options they find the most interesting. But a player can still buy more characters and places

If a player already purchased any of the Toca Life games (shown here), then they will have access to those apps within Toca Life: World. Players can play with the characters from the individual Toca Life apps inside any of the Toca Life: World locations.

A web series based on the game, under the title Toca Life Stories, was released in February 21, 2020 on Toca Boca's official YouTube channel. It focused on four close friends with mismatched personalities, Rita, Zeke, Nari and Leon (the main characters in the Toca Life app series), on a quest to vanquish boredom in their neighborhood of OK Street (based on one of the towns found in Toca Life: World). The series is animated by Canada-based Pipeline Studios, with voices recorded in America-based Studiopolis, despite it being a web series, it briefly aired on some television channels such as Pop in the United Kingdom.

List of applications developed
A list of applications released to the market is as follows:
 46. Toca Hair Salon 4, March 6, 2020
 45. Toca Kitchen Sushi, December 6, 2018
 44. Toca Life: World, November 21, 2018
 43. Toca Life: Neighborhood, October 25, 2018
 42. Toca Mystery House, June 14, 2018
 41. Toca Life: After School, March 22, 2018
 40. Toca Life: Pets, December 6, 2017
 39. Toca Life: Office, September 20, 2017
 38. Toca Lab: Plants, June 14, 2017
 37. Toca Life: Hospital, April 12, 2017
 36. Toca Hair Salon 3, December 7, 2016
 35. Toca Life: Stable, November 23, 2016
 34. Toca Life: Farm, October 26, 2016
 33. Toca Life: Vacation, June 15, 2016
 32. Toca Dance Free, March 29, 2016
 31. Toca Dance, March 1, 2016
 30. Toca Blocks, December 16, 2015
 29. Toca Life: School, October 28, 2015
 28. Toca Life: City, June 25, 2015
 27. Toca Kitchen 2, December 18, 2014
 26. Toca Nature, November 13, 2014
 25. Toca Boo, October 23, 2014
 24. Toca Life: Town, May 29, 2014
 23. Toca Pet Doctor, February 27, 2014
 22. Toca Lab: Elements, December 12, 2013
 21. Toca Hair Salon Me, November 27, 2013
 20. Toca Mini, October 24, 2013
 19. Toca Cars, September 18, 2013
 18. Toca Builders, June 20, 2013
 17. Toca Hair Salon 2, December 13, 2012
 16. Toca Tailor: Fairy Tales, November 29, 2012
 15. Toca Tailor, October 25, 2012
 14. Toca Band, September 20, 2012
 13. Toca Train, June 14, 2012
 12. Toca Kitchen Monsters, April 5, 2012
 11. Toca House, February 23, 2012
 10. Toca Kitchen, December 15, 2011
 9. Toca Hair Salon - Christmas Gift, November 30, 2011
 8. Toca Birthday Party, October 13, 2011
 7. Toca Store, October 5, 2011
 6. Toca Robot Lab, July 14, 2011
 5. Toca Hair Salon, June 7, 2011
 4. Paint My Wings, May 25, 2011
 3. Toca Doctor, April 28, 2011
 2. Toca Tea Party, March 16, 2011
 1. Helicopter Taxi, March 15, 2011

Digital toys
The term digital toy is sometimes used to differentiate certain apps from more typical virtual games. While most aspects between the two are the same, Toca Boca distinguishes digital toys as more "open-ended" with fewer rules. However, neither are thought nor proven to have a more or less harmful or beneficial impact on players. While these "digital toys" are aimed towards children, it does not mean they are just for children.

Awards
Toca Boca has won:

2022

 Kidscreen Award Winner, Best Game App—Original: Toca Life World 

2021

 App Store Awards Winner: iPhone App of the Year: Toca Life World 

2020

 Webby Award Winner in the Apps and Software category, Family & Kids 2020: Toca Life World 

2019

 Kidscreen Award Nominee, Best Game App—Original: Toca Mystery House
 Parent's Choice, Silver Award: Toca Life: World

2018

 Fas Company, Innovation by Design: Toca Lab: Plants
 KAPi Best Children's App (older kids): Toca Life: Hospital 
 Parent's Choice, Silver Award: Toca Life: World
 Kidscreen Award Nominee, Best Game App—Original: Toca Life: Hospital

2017

 Kidscreen Award in Best Video Streaming Platform for TocaTV

2015
 Webby Award Finalist in the Mobile Sites & Apps category for Toca Nature
 2015 BolognaRagazzi Digital Award Mention for Toca Nature
 iKids Award 2015: Best Learning App - Tablet for Toca Lab

2014
 Cinekid App of the Year for Toca Pet Doctor
 The National Parenting Publications Award (NAPPA) for Toca Town (Silver)
 The Lovie Award Silver Winner in the Mobile & Applications category for Toca Lab
 Junior Design Awards 2014, Shortlisted for Best Children's App
 App Store Best iPhone Apps of 2014 for Toca Lab
 App Store Best iPad Apps of 2014 for Toca Nature

2013
 The KAPI Award for Most Pioneering Team in Children's Technology
 Bestekinderapps.de Best Innovative Apps & Games for Kids 2013 for Toca Tailor and Toca Hair Salon Me
 TIFF (Toronto International Film Festival) Kids Audience Choice Favourite digiPlaySpace App Award for Toca Kitchen
 iKids Award 2013: Best Game App - 6 and Up for Toca Tailor
 Parents Choice Award for Toca Tailor (Gold), Toca Hair Salon 2 (Silver), Toca Band (Gold), Toca Builders (Gold), Toca Train (Silver)

2012
The Lovie Awards for Toca Kitchen (bronze) and Toca Hair Salon (shortlist entertainment) 
 The National Parenting Publications Award (NAPPA) in the Virtual category for Toca Kitchen (gold) and Toca Train (honors) 
The Parents' Choice Awards for Toca Tea Party (gold), Toca Kitchen (gold), Toca Robot Lab (gold), and Toca Hair Salon (silver). Toca Boca was the only development studio in the mobile category to win three gold awards.

2011
The Telenor Digital Prize
 The National Parenting Publications Award (NAPPA) for Toca Hair Salon (gold) in Children's Media / Virtual Category

References

External links
 Toca Boca official website

Swedish artist groups and collectives
Video game companies of Sweden
2005 establishments in Sweden
Video game companies established in 2010
2016 mergers and acquisitions
Companies based in Stockholm